The 2018–19 Prince Mohammad bin Salman League was the 2nd season of the Prince Mohammad bin Salman League under its current name, and 42nd season of the Saudi First Division since its establishment in 1976. The season started on 28 August 2018 and concluded on 15 May 2019. Fixtures for the 2018–19 season were announced on 25 July 2018.

The first team to be promoted was Abha, following their 2–2 draw away to Al-Nojoom on 30 April 2019. Despite losing to Al-Qaisumah, Abha were crowned champions on 11 May 2019 following Damac's 1–1 draw with Al-Ain. The second team to be promoted was Damac, in spite of their 1–0 defeat away to Al-Tai, on 5 May 2019. The third and final team to be promoted was Al-Adalah, who were promoted on the final matchday following their 2–0 win at home against Damac on 15 May 2019.

Overview

First Division rebranding
On 7 March 2018, the Saudi FF announced that the league would be increased from 16 teams to 20 teams. The competition will be known as the Prince Mohammad bin Salman League for the second season.

Rule changes
On 7 March 2018, the SAFF announced that the numbers of foreign players were increased from 3 players to 7 players. They also increased the prize money to SAR 10 million.

Teams
A total of 20 teams are contesting the league, including 9 sides from the 2017–18 season, 6 promoted teams from the Second Division, the two playoff losers from the 2017–18 Pro League playoffs, and three winners from the 2017–18 relegation playoffs.

No teams were relegated from the Pro League. Due to an increase in the number of teams, the Saudi FF announced that the relegation was canceled and in its place was a relegation play-off. Both Pro League teams, Al-Raed and Ohod, won the playoffs and secured their top-flight status.

Al-Washm were promoted as the winners of the Second Division and Al-Jabalain were promoted as the runners-up. Al-Jeel defeated Al-Ansar in the third place playoffs. Both teams were promoted after the increase of teams. The 4 teams were joined by the third-placed teams of both groups, Al-Adalah and Al-Ain. Abha defeated Al-Watani in the relegation playoffs and became the only Second Division side to win their relegation playoff match.

Al-Washm and Al-Ain will play in the Prince Mohammad bin Salman League for the first time in their history. Al-Jabalain return to the MS League for the first time since the 2007–08 season. Abha return to the MS League for the first time since the 2014–15 season. Al-Ansar return to the MS League for the first time since the 2013–14 season. Al-Adalah and Al-Jeel return to the MS League after only a season's absence.

On 4 May 2018 Al-Watani became the only club to be relegated to the Second Division following their 1–0 defeat to Abha.

Team changes
The following teams have changed division since the 2017–18 season.

To Prince Mohammad bin Salman League
Promoted from Second Division
 Al-Washm
 Al-Jabalain
 Al-Jeel
 Al-Ansar
 Al-Ain
 Al-Adalah
 Abha

From Prince Mohammad bin Salman League
Promoted to Pro League
 Al-Wehda
 Al-Hazem

Relegated to Second Division
 Al-Watani

Stadia and locations

1:  Najran will play at Prince Sultan bin Abdul Aziz Stadium due to the ongoing war in Yemen 
2:  Al-Adalah, Al-Jeel, Al-Nojoom and Hajer also use Al-Fateh Club Stadium (7,000 seats) as a home stadium.

Foreign players
The number of foreign players is limited to 7 per team.

Players name in bold indicates the player is registered during the mid-season transfer window.

League table

Positions by round
The table lists the positions of teams after each week of matches. In order to preserve chronological evolvements, any postponed matches are not included in the round at which they were originally scheduled but added to the full round they were played immediately afterward.

Results

Season progress

Statistics

Scoring

Top scorers

Hat-tricks

Clean sheets

See also
 2018–19 Saudi Professional League
 2018–19 Second Division
 2019 King Cup
 2018 Super Cup

References

Saudi First Division League seasons
Saudi
2018–19 in Saudi Arabian football